Stephen Vincent Faraone (born July 27, 1956) is an American psychologist. He has worked mainly on attention-deficit hyperactivity disorder and related disorders and is considered one of the most influential psychologists in the world.

Education and career
Faraone graduated in 1978 from the State University of New York at Stony Brook with a BA in Psychology. He then went to the University of Iowa where he obtained his Master of Arts and Doctor of Philosophy. Faraone completed a postdoctoral clinical psychology internship and a research fellowship at Brown University.

After completing his post-doctoral fellowship at Brown, Faraone came to the Harvard Department of Psychiatry, where he began a career in psychiatric genetics. He first served as an instructor in 1985, and as an assistant professor in 1989. He was promoted to associate professor in 1993 and Full Professor in 2002. In 2004, he moved to SUNY Upstate Medical University where he is now Distinguished Professor of Psychiatry and of Neuroscience and Physiology. He is also Senior Scientific Advisor to the Research Program Pediatric Psychopharmacology at the Massachusetts General Hospital and a lecturer at Harvard Medical School. Faraone has been principal investigator on several National Institutes of Health funded grants studying the nature and causes of mental disorders in childhood. He is one of the world's leading authorities on the genetics of psychiatric disorders and has also made substantial contributions to research in psychopharmacology and research methodology.  He led the International Consensus Statement on ADHD, and heads the ADHD Evidence Project, which curates evidence-based information about ADHD.

Awards and honors
Faraone has authored over 700 journal articles, editorials, chapters, and books and was the eighth-highest producer of High Impact Papers in Psychiatry from 1990 to 1999 as determined by the Institute for Scientific Information (ISI). In 2005, ISI determined him to be the second highest cited author in the area of ADHD and in 2007, he was the third most highly cited researcher in psychiatry for the preceding decade.  From 2014 to 2021 he has been listed as a highly cited researcher by Thomson Reuters/Clarivate Analytics.  In 2019 and 2020, his citation metrics placed him in the top 0.01% of scientists across all fields.  In 2021, expertscape indicated he was the top-rated expert in ADHD, worldwide (https://bit.ly/3j9n8w2).  His Web of Science lifetime H-Index as of December 2021 was 153

In 2002, Faraone was inducted into the CHADD Hall of Fame in recognition of outstanding achievement in medicine and education research on attention disorders. In 2004 and 2008, Faraone was elected Vice President of the International Society of Psychiatric Genetics and in 2019 he received the Paul Hoch Award from the American Psychopathological Association. In 2008, he received the SUNY Upstate President's Award for Excellence and Leadership in Research. In 2019 he was elected President of the World Federation of ADHD   In 2022 he was elected to the Norwegian Academy of Science and Letters.

Research Funding and Financial Disclosures

Faraone's research has been funded by the U.S. National Institute of Health, the European Union and the following companies: Otsuka, Shire/Takeda, Ironshore, McNeil, Janssen and Supernus. He has received income or potential income from Aardvark, Rhodes, OnDosis, Oysta, Sky Therapeutics, AIMH, Tris, Otsuka, Arbor, Ironshore, KemPharm/Corium, Akili, Supernus, Shire/Takeda, Atentiv, Noven, Axsome and Genomind. With his institution, he has US patent US20130217707 A1 for the use of sodium-hydrogen exchange inhibitors in the treatment of ADHD.  These disclosures are routinely reported in relevant publications

Books published
 Tsuang MT, Faraone SV. The Genetics of Mood Disorders, Baltimore, MD: Johns Hopkins; 1990
 Faraone SV, Tsuang, D, Tsuang MT.  Genetics of Mental Disorders: A Guide for Students, Clinicians, and Researchers, New York, NY: Guilford;1999.
 Faraone, S.V.  Straight Talk About Your Child’s Mental Health:  What To Do When Something Seems Wrong, New York, NY: Guilford, 2003.
 Tsuang MT, Faraone SV & Glatt SG Schizophrenia:  The Facts, Oxford University Press; 2011.
 Faraone, S.V. & Antshel, K. ADHD: Non-Pharmacologic Interventions Elsevier, 2014

References

1956 births
Living people
Schizophrenia researchers
Attention deficit hyperactivity disorder researchers
Stony Brook University alumni
University of Iowa alumni
Brown University fellows
Harvard Medical School faculty
Bipolar disorder researchers
State University of New York Upstate Medical University faculty
Massachusetts General Hospital faculty